Peter Laurence Bowring Stoddart (24 June 1934 – 19 April 2019) was an English cricketer.  Stoddart was a right-handed batsman.  He was born in Regent's Park, London and was educated at Sandroyd School in Wiltshire and then Eton College, where he captained the college cricket team.

Stoddart made his debut for Buckinghamshire in the 1955 Minor Counties Championship against Norfolk.  Pickett played Minor counties cricket for Buckinghamshire from 1955 to 1967, which included 77 Minor Counties Championship matches.  In made his only List A appearance for Buckinghamshire against Middlesex in the 1965 Gillette Cup.  In this match he was run out for a duck.

Stoddart also played a single first-class match for the Marylebone Cricket Club against Ireland in 1958.  In the match he scored 11 runs in the MCC first-innings, before being dismissed by Joseph Burke, and in their second-innings he was dismissed for 11 by Scott Huey.

References

External links
Peter Stoddart at ESPNcricinfo
Peter Stoddart at CricketArchive

1934 births
2019 deaths
Cricketers from Greater London
People educated at Sandroyd School
People educated at Eton College
English cricketers
Buckinghamshire cricketers
Marylebone Cricket Club cricketers
Buckinghamshire cricket captains